Bryan is an unincorporated community located in Russell County, Kentucky, United States. It was also known as Alva.

References

Unincorporated communities in Russell County, Kentucky
Unincorporated communities in Kentucky